The Waterloo Warriors are the athletic teams that represent the University of Waterloo in Waterloo, Ontario, Canada. The Warriors have found success over certain spans in football, hockey, rugby, golf and basketball among others, and the Warriors have won national championships in hockey (1974), basketball (1975), and women's swimming (1975). For many years from the 1960s through the 1990s, Warrior basketball games attracted the largest and rowdiest basketball crowds in the country. The Warriors Football teams have won two Yates Cup Championships, in 1997 and in 1999. The team's 2010 season was cancelled after a steroid scandal, the biggest ever in CIS Football history.

Waterloo's teams were originally known as the "Mules" after the school's founding in 1957, and for a while the women's teams were the "Mulettes", a name that was almost universally despised and ultimately replaced by "Athenas". Today the women's teams also use the nickname Warriors. University Stadium was originally built for the Warriors Football program, but was sold to the City of Waterloo in 1974 when UW could not afford to repair the stadium. The stadium was later sold by the City of Waterloo to Wilfrid Laurier University in 1992, where it is now the home of the Wilfrid Laurier Golden Hawks. The Warriors now play at Warrior Field, which was renovated to be ready for the 2011 football season.

Varsity teams
Waterloo Warriors teams compete in:
 Badminton (m/w)
 Baseball (m)
 Basketball (m/w)
 Cross Country Running (m/w)
 Curling (m/w)
 Cheerleading (co-ed)
 Fencing (m/w)
 Field hockey (w)
 Figure Skating (m/w)
 Ice hockey (m/w)
 Football (m)
 Golf (m/w)
 Rugby (m/w)
 Soccer (m/w)
 Swimming (m/w)
 Squash (m/w)
 Tennis (m/w)
 Track & Field (m/w)
 Volleyball (m/w)

Waterloo Warriors Football

The Waterloo Warriors football team has been in operation since 1957, winning two Yates Cup conference championships in 1997 and 1999. Currently, they are one of six teams to have never appeared in a Vanier Cup game and the longest tenured program in the OUA to have never qualified for the national championship game. The football team last qualified for the playoffs in 2019. The team is led by Chris Bertoia, Head Coach and Manager of Football Operations since the 2015 season.

Waterloo Warriors Golf
The first men's team was created in 1958 and coached by Carl Totzke, the Director of Athletics from 1957 until 1989, when he retired.
Jack Pearse became the golf coach in 1968 and in 1969 guided the Warriors to their first ever conference title.

The first women's golf team was fielded in 2005 under the guidance of coach Carla Munch.

Warrior men's teams have won the Ruttan Cup awarded to conference champions eleven times. Until 1970, the Warriors played in the OQAA (Ontario-Quebec Athletic conference). Since 1970, they have been part of the OUA (Ontario University Athletics)

Ruttan Cup Team Champions

 1969 Paul Knight, Dave Cooper, Brian White, Dave Hollinger, Bob Skura
 1970 Brian White, Dave Cooper, Byron Radtke, Dave Hollinger, Bob Skura
 1972 Dave Hollinger Tim McCutcheon, Dave Bogdon, Ed Heakes, Fred Wilder
 1975 Fred Wilder, Don McLean, Rick Haynes, Rob Ackford,  Bob Pontin
 2003 Justin Fluit, Mark Burke Jud Whiteside, Mark VanderBeek, Jaspreet Walia
 2005 Justin Fluit, Mark VanderBeek, Jimmy Latta, Jud Whiteside, Arjun Walia
 2006 Jud Whiteside, Victor Ciesielski, Jimmy Latta, Matt Robson, Arjun Walia
 2011 Garrett Rank, Smon McInnis, Gajan Sivabalasingham, James Krantz, Adam Wilson
 2014 Gajan Sivabalasingham, Dylan Cave, Dan Wilson, Brandon Pearce, David French
 2015 Gajan Sivabalasingham, Dylan Cave, Jake Adams, Devin Bartlett, David French
 2016 Jake Adams, David French, Devin Bartlett, Tyson Turchanski, Jordy Denomme

Warrior women's teams have won the Liz Hoffman Cup awarded to OUA conference champions two times as follows

 2010 Tiffany Terrier, Devon Rizzo, Jane Tang, Mandy Wong
 2011 Devon Rizzo, Jane Tang, Mandy Wong, Heather Wogden

Warrior men who have won the McCall/Len Shore Individual Golf Champion Award for the conference the Warriors plays in are

 1961 Mike Whitney
 1972 Tim McCutcheon
 1995 Steve Woods
 2006 Jimmy Latta
 2010 Garrett Rank
 2011 Garrett Rank
 2014 Gajan Sivabalasingham
 2015 Gajan Sivabalasingham

Warrior women who have won the Individual Golf Champion Award for the conference Warriors plays in are

 2009 Tiffany Terrier
 2010 Tiffany Terrier
 2013 Devon Rizzo

Best finish in RCGA University College/University Team Championships

Men 
 2012 - 2nd  Simon McGinnis, Gajan Sivabalasingham, Adam Wilson, James Krantz

Women 
 2011 - 3rd  Tiffany Terrier, Devon Rizzo, Jane Tang, Mandy Wong

The golf Warriois have a long history of excellent coaches. Using a philosophy of encouraging players to be both excellent athletes and well rounded individuals they created a culture that has attracted many talented players. As a result, the following coaches have been recognized by the OUA and RCGA as coach of the year

Men's OUA Coach of the Year 
 2003 Doug Painter
 2005 Dave Hollinger
 2006 Dave Hollinger
 2010 Dave Hollinger
 2011 Dave Hollinger
 2014 Dave Hollinger
 2015 Dave Hollinger
 2016 Dave Hollinger

Women's OUA Coach of the Year 
 2007 Carla Munch
 2008 Carla Munch

RCGA Men's Coach of the Year - Pearse Trophy 
 2011 Dave Hollinger

Waterloo Warriors Hockey

See also
 U Sports

References

External links